Lachnaia zoiai is a species of leaf beetles from the subfamily of Cryptocephalinae that inhabits in the southern part of Greece and Crete.

References

Clytrini
Beetles described in 1997